Down by the River Where the Dead Men Go is a 1995 book by novelist George Pelecanos. It is the third book of a trilogy with the same protagonist, Nick Stefanos.  In a scene in the movie "Shallow Hal," the main character is seen reading this book.

Context
In this volume he has retired from his previous job as a crime investigator in Washington D.C., and makes a living as a bartender at a local bar.

Plot summary
Stefanos struggles with his growing unhappiness and tries to drown it in alcohol. He gets drawn into the murder of Calvin Jeter and his conscience pulls him back to his earlier occupation. It becomes a journey through the harshest part of the American capital and the blackest part of the human soul.

Notes

1995 American novels
Novels by George Pelecanos
Novels set in Washington, D.C.
St. Martin's Press books